Tamarind Institute is a lithography workshop created in 1970 as a division of the University of New Mexico in Albuquerque, NM, United States. It began as Tamarind Lithography Workshop, a California non-profit corporation founded by June Wayne on Tamarind Avenue in Los Angeles in 1960. Both the current Institute and the original Lithography Workshop are referred to informally as "Tamarind."

Origin and goals

Tamarind was founded in the absence of an American print shop dedicated to serving artists, and during a period when American artists tended to reject lithography and collaborative printing in favor of the more "direct...immediate" possibilities of abstract expressionist painting.

Faced with a paucity of opportunities on all fronts and a medium which seemed on the verge of extinction, Wayne sought to create more than just a studio:

Tamarind Institute's website lists the following goals, developed by founding director June Wayne with associate director Clinton Adams and technical director Garo Antreasian in 1960:

 To create a pool of master artisan-printers in the United States by training apprentices;
 To develop a group of American artists of diverse styles into masters of this medium;
 To habituate each artist and artisan to intimate collaboration so that each becomes responsive and stimulating to the other in the work situation encouraging both to experiment widely and extend the expressive potential of the medium;
 To stimulate new markets for the lithograph;
 To plan a format to guide the artisan in earning his living outside of subsidy or total dependence on the artist's pocket;
 To restore the prestige of lithography by actually creating a collection of extraordinary prints.

Impact
Tamarind can be credited with single-handedly reviving the medium of lithography in the US, both insofar as they made the medium "respectable" and viable and also in that their dedicated research led to technical and economic breakthroughs with a visible impact on lithography in particular and printmaking in general; e.g., lightfast inks, durable and consistent printmaking paper, precise registration systems, aluminum plate printing, and lightweight, large diameter rollers are but a few important aspects of printmaking which either originated at or were refined by Tamarind. The workshop also established several now-customary procedures for editioned prints, such as precisely recording and documenting every edition, and affixing both a workshop chop and a printer's chop to each proof or impression in recognition of the printer's important role.

Artists
Below is a partial list of some of the many artists who have created editions at Tamarind:

 Rodolfo Abularach
 Clinton Adams
 Kinji Akagawa
 Anni Albers
 Josef Albers
Garo Antreasian
 Polly Apfelbaum
 Ruth Asawa
 Sandow Birk
 Jack Boynton
 Hans Burkhardt
 Squeak Carnwath
 Willie Cole
 José Luis Cuevas
 Amy Cutler
 Elaine de Kooning
 Roy De Forest
 Dorothy Dehner
Richard Diebenkorn
 Lesley Dill
 Jim Dine
 Burhan Doğançay
 Walton Ford
Sam Francis
 Tina Fuentes
 Sonia Gechtoff
Gego
 Samia Halaby
 Frederick Hammersley
 Margo Humphrey
 James Kelly
William Kentridge
Joyce Kozloff
 Robert Kushner
 Hung Liu
 Nicola López
 Eleanore Mikus
 Louise Nevelson
 Joseph Raffael
 Mel Ramos
 Willy Bo Richardson
 Ed Ruscha
 Jaune Quick-to-See Smith
 Kiki Smith
 Robert Stackhouse
 Hedda Sterne
 Donald Sultan
 June Wayne

Master printers

One of the principal goals of the Tamarind Institute is the training of printers. Over the years, the training of these professionals has evolved since its creation in 1960. What began as an eight-week basic training course eventually developed into a two-year program. There are five levels in the program: student printer, candidate printer, assistant printer, senior printer, and master printer. There have been over 100 Master Program certificates awarded by the Tamarind Institute. 

The first master printer graduate from Tamarind was Irwin Hollander of Hollander's Workshop in New York City. Judith Solodkin was the first woman to complete the program. Joe Funk was the first Tamarind fellow, serving between 1960 to 1961. From 1972 to 1973, Chen Lok Lee received a fellowship from the Ford Foundation, funded in part by the National Endowment for the Arts, to study at Tamarind. Lee went on to found Mantegna Press II, with Richard Callner, in Philadelphia, PA.

References

Sources

External links
 

Lithography
Organizations based in Albuquerque, New Mexico
Printing in the United States